The Visita de San Telmo was a Catholic visita located along the Arroyo de San Telmo in Baja California, Mexico. The visita was founded by Dominican missionaries sometime between 1798-1800 as an extension of Misión Santo Domingo de la Frontera.

Overview

When geographer Peveril Meigs investigated the area in 1926, he identified two areas on the Arroyo de San Telmo that had apparently been developed for agricultural use by the Dominicans: San Telmo de Arriba and San Telmo de Abajo, the latter being about 4 kilometers downstream to the southwest from the former.

See also

References
 Meigs, Peveril, III. 1935. The Dominican Mission Frontier of Lower California. University of California Publications in Geography No. 7. Berkeley.

Missions in Baja California
Landmarks in Ensenada
1798 establishments in New Spain